The pigeon pea (Cajanus cajan) is a perennial legume from the family Fabaceae native to the  Old World. The pigeon pea is widely cultivated in tropical and semitropical regions around the world, being commonly consumed in South Asia, Southeast Asia, Africa, Latin America and the Caribbean.

Etymology and other names

Scientific epithet
The scientific name for the genus Cajanus and the species cajan derive from the Malay word katjang meaning legume in reference to the bean of the plant.

Common English names
In English they are commonly referred to as pigeon pea which originates from the historical utilization of the pulse as pigeon fodder in Barbados. The term Congo pea and Angola pea developed due to the presence of its cultivation in Africa and the association of its utilization with those of African descent. The names no-eye pea and red gram both refer to the characteristics of the seed, with no-eye pea in reference to the lack of a hilum on most varieties, unlike the black-eyed pea, and red gram in reference to the red color of most Indian varieties and gram simply referring to the plant being a legume.

Internationally

Africa

In Benin the pigeon pea is locally known as klouékoun in Fon, otinin in Ede and eklui in Adja. In Cape Verde they are called Fixon Kongu in Cape Verdean creole. In Comoros and Mauritius they are known as embrevade or ambrebdade in Comorian and Morisyen, respectively, in return originating from the Malagasy term for the plant amberivatry. In Ghana they are known as aduwa or adowa in Dagbani. In Kenya and Tanzania they are known as mbaazi in Swahili. In Malawi they are called nandolo in Chichewa. In Nigeria pigeon peas are called fiofio or mgbụmgbụ in Igbo, waken-masar "Egyptian bean" or waken-turawa "foreigner bean" in Hausa, and otinli in Yoruba. In Sudan they are known as adaseya, adasy and adasia.

Asia

In India the plant is known by various different names such as; Assamese: অৰহৰ (arahar),• Bengali: অড়হর (arahar) মিৰি মাহ (mirai-maha) • Gujarati: તુવેર (tuver) • Hindi: अरहर (arhar), तुवर (tuvar) • Kannada: ತೊಗರಿ ಬೆಳೆ (togari bele), ತೊಗರಿ ಕಾಳು (togari kalu) • Konkani: तोरी (tori) • Malayalam: ആഢകി (adhaki), തുവര (tuvara) • Manipuri: মাইৰোংবী (mairongbi) • Marathi: तूर (tur) • Nepali: रहर (rahar) • Oriya: ହର୍ ହର୍ (har-har), କାକ୍ଷୀ (kakshi), ତୁବର (tubara) • Persian: شاخول (shakhul) • Punjabi: ਦਿੰਗੇਰ (dinger) • Tamil: ஆடகி (adhaki), இருப்புலி (iruppuli), காய்ச்சி (kaycci), and துவரை (tuvarai) • Telugu: ఆఢకి (adhaki), కంది (kandi), తొగరి (togari), తువరము (tuvaramu) • Tibetan: tu ba ri and in Urdu: ارهر (arhar), توأر (tuar).

In the Philippines they are known as Kadios in Filipino and Kadyos in Tagalog.

The Americas
In Latin America, they are known as guandul or gandul in Spanish, and feijão andu or gandu in Portuguese all of which derive from Kikongo wandu or from Kimbundu oanda; both names referring to the same plant.

In the Anglophone regions of the Caribbean, like Jamaica, they are known as Gungo peas, coming from the more archaic English name for the plant congo pea, given to the plant because of its popularity and relation to Sub-Saharan Africa.

In Francophone regions of the Caribbean they are known as pois d' angole, pwa di bwa in Antillean creole and pwa kongo in Haitian creole.

In Suriname they are known as wandoe or gele pesi, the former of which is derived from the same source as its Spanish and Portuguese counterparts, the latter of which literally translates to 'yellow pea' from Dutch and Sranan Tongo.

Oceania
In Hawaii they are known as pi pokoliko 'Puerto Rican pea'  or pi nunu 'pigeon pea' in the Hawaiian language.

History and origin

Origin
The closest relatives to the cultivated pigeon pea are Cajanus cajanifolia, Cajanus scarabaeoides and Cajanus kerstingii, native to India and the latter West Africa respectively. Much debate exist over the geographical origin of the species, with some groups claiming origin from the Nile river and Western Africa, and the other Indian origin. The two epicenters of genetic diversity exist in both Africa and India, but India is considered to be its primary center of origin with West Africa being considered a second major center of origin.

History
By at least 2,800 BCE in peninsular India, where its presumptive closest wild relatives Cajanus cajanifolia occurs in tropical deciduous woodlands, its cultivation has been documented. Archaeological finds of pigeon pea cultivation dating to about 14th century BC have also been found at the Neolithic site of Sanganakallu in Kalaburagi and its border area Tuljapur (where the cultivation of African domesticated plants like pearl millet, finger millet, and Lablab have also been uncovered), as well as in Gopalpur and other South Indian states.

From India it may have made its way to North-East Africa via Trans-Oceanic Bronze Age trade that allowed cross-cultural exchange of resources and agricultural products.  The earliest evidence of pigeon peas in Africa was found in Ancient Egypt with the presence of seeds in Egyptian tombs dating back to around 2,200 BCE.  From eastern Africa, cultivation spread further west and south through the continent, where by means of the Trans-Atlantic slave trade, it reached the Americas around the 17th century.

Pigeon peas were reportedly introduced to Hawaii in 1824 by James Macrae with a few specimens reportedly becoming naturalized on the islands, but they wouldn't gain much popularity until later. By the early 20th century Filipinos and Puerto Ricans began to emigrate from the American Philippines and Puerto Rico to Hawaii to work in sugarcane plantations in 1906 and 1901, respectively. Pigeon peas are said to have been popularized on the island by the Puerto Rican community where by the First World War their cultivation began, to expand on the island where they are stilled cultivated and consumed by locals.

Nutrition

Pigeon peas contain high levels of protein and the important amino acids methionine, lysine, and tryptophan.

The following table indicates completeness of nutritional profile of various amino acids within mature seeds of pigeon pea.

Methionine + Cystine combination is the only limiting amino acid combination in pigeon pea. In contrast to the mature seeds, the immature seeds are generally lower in all nutritional values, however they contain a significant amount of vitamin C (39 mg per 100 g serving) and have a slightly higher fat content. Research has shown that the protein content of the immature seeds is of a higher quality.

Cultivation

Pigeon peas can be of a perennial variety, in which the crop can last three to five years (although the seed yield drops considerably after the first two years), or an annual variety more suitable for seed production.

Global production

World production of pigeon peas is estimated at 4.49 million tons. About 63% of this production comes from India. The total number of hectares grown to pigeon pea is estimated at 5.4 million. India accounts for 72% of the area grown to pigeon pea or 3.9 million hectares. Africa is the secondary centre of diversity and at present it contributes about 21% of global production with 1.05 million tons. Malawi, Tanzania, Kenya, Mozambique and Uganda are the major producers in Africa.

The pigeon pea is an important legume crop of rainfed agriculture in the semiarid tropics. The Indian subcontinent, Africa and Central America, in that order, are the world's three main pigeon pea-producing regions. Pigeon peas are cultivated in more than 25 tropical and subtropical countries, either as a sole crop or intermixed with cereals, such as sorghum (Sorghum bicolor), pearl millet (Pennisetum glaucum), or maize (Zea mays), or with other legumes, such as peanuts (Arachis hypogea). Being a legume capable of symbiosis with Rhizobia, the bacteria associated with the pigeon pea enrich soils through symbiotic nitrogen fixation.

The crop is cultivated on marginal land by resource-poor farmers, who commonly grow traditional medium- and long-duration (5–11 months) landraces. Short-duration pigeon peas (3–4 months) suitable for multiple cropping have recently been developed. Traditionally, the use of such input as fertilizers, weeding, irrigation, and pesticides is minimal, so present yield levels are low (average = ). Greater attention is now being given to managing the crop because it is in high demand at remunerative prices.

Pigeon peas are very drought-resistant and can be grown in areas with less than 650 mm annual rainfall. With the maize crop failing three out of five years in drought-prone areas of Kenya, a consortium led by the International Crops Research Institute for the Semi-Arid Tropics (ICRISAT) aimed to promote the pigeon pea as a drought-resistant, nutritious alternative crop.

Breeding
John Spence, a botanist and politician from Trinidad and Tobago, developed several varieties of dwarf pigeon peas which can be harvested by machine, instead of by hand.

Genome sequence
The pigeon pea is the first seed legume plant to have its complete genome sequenced. The sequencing was first accomplished by a group of 31 Indian scientists from the Indian Council of Agricultural Research. It was then followed by a global research partnership, the International Initiative for Pigeon pea Genomics (IIPG), led by ICRISAT with partners such as BGI–Shenzhen (China), US research laboratories like University of Georgia, University of California-Davis, Cold Spring Harbor Laboratory, and National Centre for Genome Resources, European research institutes like the National University of Ireland Galway. It also received support from the CGIAR Generation Challenge Program, US National Science Foundation and in-kind contribution from the collaborating research institutes. It is the first time that a CGIAR-supported research center such as ICRISAT led the genome sequencing of a food crop. There was a controversy over this as CGIAR did not partner with a national team of scientists and broke away from the Indo American Knowledge Initiative to start their own sequencing in parallel.

The 616 mature microRNAs and 3919 long non-codingRNAs sequences were identified in the genome of pigeon pea.

Dehulling 

Various methodologies exist in order to remove the pulse from its shell. In earlier days hand pounding was common. Several traditional methods are used that can be broadly classified under two categories: the wet method and the dry method. The Wet method Involves water soaking, sun drying and dehulling. The Dry method Involves oil/water application, drying in the sun, and dehulling. Depending on the magnitude of operation, large-scale commercial dehulling of large quantities of pigeon pea into its deskinned, split version, known as toor dal in Hindi, is done in mechanically operated mills.

Uses

In cuisine
Pigeon peas are both a food crop (dried peas, flour, or green vegetable peas) and a forage/cover crop. In combination with cereals, pigeon peas make a well-balanced meal and hence are favored by nutritionists as an essential ingredient for balanced diets. The dried peas may be sprouted briefly, then cooked, for a flavor different from the green or dried peas. Sprouting also enhances the digestibility of dried pigeon peas via the reduction of indigestible sugars that would otherwise remain in the cooked dried peas.

Africa

In Cape Verde they make a soup with the dried pigeon peas called feijão Congo, after its own name, made with dried pigeon peas in a similar manner to Brazilian feijoada.

In the Enugu state of Nigeria, and igbo dish called Ẹchịcha or Achịcha is made with palm oil, cocoyam, and seasoning. It is also similar to other dishes from the state such as ayarya ji and fio-fio.

In Ethiopia, the pods, the young shoots and leaves, are cooked and eaten.

Asia

In India, it is one of the most popular pulses, being an important source of protein in a mostly vegetarian diet. It is the primary accompaniment to rice or roti and has the status of staple food throughout the length and breadth of India. In regions where it grows, fresh young pods are eaten as a vegetable in dishes such as sambar.

In the Western Visayas region of the Philippines, pigeon peas are the main ingredient of a very popular dish called "KBL" - an acronym for "Kadyos" (pigeon pea), "Baboy" (pork), and "Langka" (jackfruit). It is a savory soup with rich flavors coming from the pigeon peas, smoked pork preferably the legs or tail, and souring agent called batuan. Raw jackfruit meat is chopped and boiled to soft consistency, and serves as an extender. The violet color of the soup comes from the pigment of the variety commonly grown in the region.

The Americas
In the Caribbean coast of Colombia, like the Atlántico department of Colombia, the sopa de guandú con carne salada (or simply "gandules") is made with pigeon peas, yam, plantain, yuca, and spices. During the week of Semana santa a sweet is made out of pigeon peas called dulce de guandules which is made by mashed and sweetened pigeon peas with origins in the maroon community of San Basilio de Palenque.

In the Dominican Republic, a dish made of rice and green pigeon peas called moro de guandules is a traditional holiday food.

In Panama, pigeon peas are used in a dish called Arroz con guandú y coco or "rice with pigeon peas and coconut" traditionally prepared and consumed during the end of year holidays.

In Puerto Rico, arroz con gandules is made with rice and pigeon peas and sofrito which is a traditional dish, especially during Christmas season. Pigeon peas can also be made in to a stew called asopao de gandules, with plantain balls.

Jamaica also uses pigeon peas instead of kidney beans in their rice and peas dish, especially during the Christmas season.

Trinidad and Tobago and Grenada have their own variant, called pelau, which includes either beef or chicken, and occasionally pumpkin and pieces of cured pig tail.

Unlike in some other parts of the Greater Caribbean, in The Bahamas pigeon peas are used in dried form, light brown in color to make the heartier, heavier, signature Bahamian staple dish "Peas 'n Rice."

Oceania
In Hawaii they are used to make a dish called gandule rice, also called godule rice, gundule rice, and ganduddy rice originates on the island from the Puerto Rican community with historic ties to the island and is prepared in a similar manner to that of traditional Puerto Rican arroz con gandules.

Other uses

Agricultural

It is an important ingredient of animal feed used in West Africa, especially in Nigeria, where it is also grown. Leaves, pods, seeds and the residues of seed processing are used to feed all kinds of livestock.

In the Congo pigeon peas are utilized as one of the main food forest and soil improvement crops after using a slash-and-burn fire technique called maala.

Pigeon peas are in some areas an important crop for green manure, providing up to 90 kg nitrogen per hectare. The woody stems of pigeon peas can also be used as firewood, fencing, thatch and as a source for rope fiber.

Medicinal
In the Republic of Congo the Kongo, Lari, and Dondo people use the sap of the leaves as an eyedrop for epilepsy.

In Madagascar the branches have been used as a teeth cleaning twig.

See also
 List of pigeon pea diseases

References

External links

 
 Decoding of the Pigeonpea (Arhar) Genome by Indian Scientists, Indian Council of Agricultural Research
 
 ICRISAT-led global team cracks pigeonpea genome, Indian Council of Agricultural Research
 Pigeonpea a wonder crop for women farmers in Rajasthan, India, Indian Council of Agricultural Research

Phaseoleae
Edible legumes
Flora of India (region)
Crops originating from India
Nitrogen-fixing crops
Tropical agriculture
Taxa named by Carl Linnaeus